Let's Be Real is an American presidential-themed comedy puppet show that aired on Fox from April 29 to May 20, 2021. This series is based on the French show Les Guignols. 

It originally had an election-themed special on October 1, 2020.

Production
On April 1, 2021, it was announced that Fox had ordered the series which will premiere on April 29, 2021. Robert Smigel, Anna Wenger, Ben Silverman, Howard T. Owens, Kevin Healy, Greg Lipstone, Gerald-Brice Viret, Arnaud Renard and Matthieu Porte will serve as executive producers. Robert Smigel, Brian Reich and Andrew Weinberg will serve as writers.

Episodes

Series overview

Special (2020)

Season 1 (2021)

Ratings

References

External links

2020s American political comedy television series
2020s American satirical television series
2020s American sketch comedy television series
2021 American television series debuts
2021 American television series endings
American television series based on French television series
American television shows featuring puppetry
English-language television shows
Fox Broadcasting Company original programming
Political satirical television series
Television series by Fox Entertainment